Jerome Hewlett (born August 9, 1964), better known by his moniker DJ Cash Money is a Philadelphia-based American turntablist, hip-hop artist, and record producer. He was the first inductee into the DJ Hall of Fame.

Career
Hewlett studied engineering at college, but soon shifted his focus to the turntables. He adopted his DJ moniker from the phrase "there's the money shot", which people would yell whenever he threw the ball into the net while playing basketball. Among his inspirations Cash Money lists Grandmaster Flash and Grand Wizzard Theodore, whom he saw in the early 1980s, while artists who count him among their own inspirations include British DJ Fatboy Slim.

He and Jazzy Jeff both emerged from the Philadelphia hip hop scene in the late 1980s. They shared a friendly rivalry and DJ'd parties together as the Kings of Spin. Cash Money perfected the Transform scratch (along with Jazzy Jeff) which mimicked the robotic sound effects from the mid-80s television cartoon series of the same name. He is also credited with creating the Pee Wee Herman scratch and pioneering the Chirp scratch (aka the Babuggamas scratch).

In 1987, he partnered with MC Marvelous (born Marvin Berryman) and released the single "Ugly People be Quiet" (co-produced by Herbie "Love Bug" Azor) and the album, Where's The Party At? on Sleeping Bag Records. Cash Money has also produced and remixed tracks for artists such as Snoop Dogg, Busta Rhymes, Mantronix, P.M. Dawn, and Public Enemy.

Accomplishments
Cash Money won the New Music Seminar Supermen DJ Battle in 1987 and the DMC World DJ Championships in 1988.

In 1998, turntable manufacturer Technics made Cash Money the first inductee into the DJ Hall of Fame.

Discography

Cash Money and Marvelous

Albums

Singles

DJ Cash Money mix tapes
Old School Need Ta Learn'o Plot I
W.K.I.S. Holiday Head Twister
Kickin Flava
Freestyle Flavor
Guess Who's Comin' To Dinner? (1996)
Old School Need Ta Learn'o Plot II (1997)
Head Bangin' Funk 45's (2005)

References

External links
[ DJ Cash Money] in Allmusic
DJ Cash Money in Discogs
Interview with DJ Cash Money at Earwaks

Article on DJ Cash Money by World of Beats
DJ Cash Money Interview - NAMM Oral History Library (2012)

American hip hop record producers
Place of birth missing (living people)
Living people
Rappers from Philadelphia
American hip hop DJs
21st-century American rappers
Record producers from Pennsylvania
1964 births
Sleeping Bag Records artists